Roger William Salkeld (born March 6, 1971) is an American former professional baseball pitcher.

He attended Saugus High School in Santa Clarita, California. He currently resides in Santa Clarita, and is president of Skaggs Concrete Sawing.

References

External links
, or Retrosheet

1971 births
Living people
Akron Aeros players
American expatriate baseball players in Canada
Baseball players from California
Bellingham Mariners players
Calgary Cannons players
Cincinnati Reds players
Indianapolis Indians players
Jacksonville Suns players
Major League Baseball pitchers
New Orleans Zephyrs players
San Bernardino Spirit players
Seattle Mariners players
Sportspeople from Burbank, California
Tacoma Rainiers players